Mariya Filippovna Limanskaya (born 12 April 1924) was a regulator - a female  member of Red Army traffic control units, serving for three years during World War II. She became known as one of the Russian women who directed traffic at the Brandenburg Gate in 1945 after the Battle of Berlin. She has since become a symbol of the Allied victory over Nazi Germany, but she is often confused with Lydia Spivak (many online photos of Limanskaya are actually Spivak).

Biography

Early life and military service
Born in 1924 as Mariya Limanskaya, she joined the Red Army in 1942, at the height of World War II. She was 18. At that time the Soviet Stavka ("high command") increasingly lacked trained reserves to reinforce the entire  front, and as a result began to conscript underage boys and girls. Almost 800,000 women would eventually serve in the Red Army throughout the war. Little is known about Limanskaya's military career other than several occasions where she was nearly killed. At one point, she left a building a few seconds before it was leveled by a bomb attack. She also contracted malaria.

Brandenburg Gate and victory icon
After the Battle of Berlin ended in early May 1945, Limanskaya was assigned to direct traffic at the Brandenburg Gate during the Potsdam Conference in late July. While conducting her duties, she was photographed, filmed, and also interviewed by Yevgeny Khaldei, a journalist employed by TASS, a state news agency. Her picture was widely published in newspapers and magazines worldwide and she quickly became an iconic image of the victory over Nazi Germany. However, all of this is possibly confusion with Lydia Spivak, another regulator who was actually filmed and interviewed at the Brandenburg gate. Limanskaya furthermore had a brief conversation with the British leader Winston Churchill as his entourage was passing by the gate on their way to Potsdam. Limanskaya later said about her meeting Churchill, "[he] looked precisely the way I imagined him, puffing on a cigar".

Later life and marriage
After the war, Limanskaya returned to civilian life and got married. The marriage did not last and she was forced to bring up two daughters by herself. Limanskaya later remarried, this time to a fellow veteran named Victor with whom she remained for 23 years, until his death. Due to confusion with Lydia Spivak, she is often mistakenly referred to as "Anna Pavlova" in television documentaries and other media presentations.

See also
 Soviet women in World War II
 Women in the Russian and Soviet military

References

Sources

Printed

Online

External links
 Maria Limanskaya interview with English subtitles on YouTube

1924 births
Women in World War II
Women in the Russian and Soviet military
Russian people of World War II
Soviet military personnel of World War II
Living people